Makartsevo is a rural locality (a settlement) in Verkhovskoye Rural Settlement, Verkhovazhsky District, Vologda Oblast, Russia. The population was 307 as of 2002. There are 11 streets.

Geography 
Makartsevo is located 38 km southwest of Verkhovazhye (the district's administrative centre) by road. Osnovinskaya is the nearest rural locality.

References 

Rural localities in Verkhovazhsky District